Korinos railway station is a railway station in Korinos, Central Macedonia, Greece. Located in the centre of the village, it opened on 9 September 2007. It is served by regional trains between Thessaloniki, Kalambaka, Palaiofarsalos and by the Suburban services for Thessaloniki, Litochoro and Larissa.

History
The station opened on 9 September 2007 on a stretch of the former Korinos-Methoni-Aigini line, which terminated close to the station. In May 2020, due in part to both vandalism and poor maintenance, Georgios Stylos, Head of building infrastructure of OSE was called to meet Korinos's Mayor Costas Grammatikopoulos.

Facilities
The station is unstaffed. The platforms are connected by subways. However, the station is not equipped with lifts. The station is equipped with onsite parking.

Services
The station is on the main line of the Greek railway system that connects Athens in the south with Thessaloniki in the North (however Intercity services do not call at the station), As a result, the city is connected directly with Larissa and Thessaloniki via the Proastiakos It is served by local stopping services to Thessaloniki, Kalambaka and Palaiofarsalos and by Proastiakos Thessaloniki to Larissa and Thessaloniki. There are around 22 services that call at the station daily.

Station layout

References

External links
https://www.gtp.gr/TDirectoryDetails.asp?ID=77269

Railway stations in Central Macedonia
Railway stations opened in 2007
Buildings and structures in Pieria (regional unit)
Katerini